Amuowghli or Amu Owghli, also rendered as Amu Oghli, may refer to:
 Amuowghli-ye Olya
 Amuowghli-ye Sofla